The following is the standings of the Persian Gulf Cup's 2002–03 football season. This season will be the second season since the establishment of the Iran Pro League (Persian Gulf Cup). Foolad Mobarakeh Sepahan F.C. became the first non-Tehran based team to win the league under the management of Farhad Kazemi.

Final classification

Awards

 League Topscorer = Edmund Bezik
 Coach Of The Year = Farhad Kazemi
 Team Of The Year = Sepahan F.C.

Results table

Last updated Jun 06 2003

Player statistics

Top goal scorers

13
  Edmond Bezik (Sepahan)
12
  Moharram Navidkia (Sepahan)
11
  Reza Enayati (Aboomoslem)
9
  Ali Alizadeh (Fajr Sepasi)
8
  Mohammad Mansouri (Bargh Shiraz)
  Mohammad Momeni (Saipa)
  Behnam Seraj (Foolad)

Participating in international competitions
2002–03 AFC Champions League
Esteghlal
Persepolis

References

Iran Premier League Statistics
Persian League

Iran Pro League seasons
Iran
1